Hurricane Otis was a moderate Category 2 hurricane that threatened the Baja California Peninsula but dissipated before landfall. Otis was the fifteenth and final named storm and seventh hurricane of the 2005 Pacific hurricane season. The storm developed on September 28, 2005, off the western coast of Mexico, from a tropical wave that emerged from the western coast of Africa and traversed the Atlantic Ocean during the preceding several weeks. After attaining tropical storm status on September 29, Otis moved in a generally northwestward direction for most of its duration. It ultimately peaked at Category 2 intensity on the Saffir–Simpson Hurricane Scale before beginning to weaken. The storm degenerated into a tropical depression on October 3 and dissipated fully on October 5, near the coast of Baja California Sur. Preparations for Otis were completed on the Peninsula; tropical cyclone watches and warnings were declared and numerous shelters opened. However, the storm's effects were minimal, and limited to gusty winds with heavy rainfall. No major damage was reported.

Meteorological history

The origins of Hurricane Otis are believed to have been in a tropical wave that emerged from the west coast of Africa on September 9. The wave moved westward across the Atlantic Ocean, spawning Tropical Depression Seventeen on September 17. The southern portion of the wave continued westward, crossing into the eastern Pacific Ocean on September 22. As the wave entered a monsoon-like environment, convection increased on September 23. An associated area of disorganized clouds and thunderstorms persisted off the coast of Mexico for several days, although due to wind shear and its proximity to land, short-term tropical cyclone development—if any—was expected to occur slowly. On September 27, it began to show signs of organization; the National Hurricane Center (NHC) remarked upon the potential for a tropical cyclone to develop within the next day.

The depression moved slowly toward the southwest and became better organized, despite a decrease in the coverage of deep convection. That evening, wind shear relented and conditions became more favorable for the storm's intensification. Convection wrapped almost fully around the center, and early on September 3, Otis was upgraded to a Category 1 hurricane on the Saffir–Simpson Hurricane Scale. Shortly thereafter, a ragged eye feature developed; it quickly became better defined as it entered the scope of weather radar in Cabo San Lucas.

Otis began gradually entering cooler ocean waters, although the National Hurricane Center noted in one of its discussions on the system that the environment was still warm enough to support a stronger storm. The hurricane continued drifting northwestward, and early on October 1 it reached peak intensity at Category 2 status. At the time, maximum sustained winds were at 105 mph (165 km/h) and barometric pressure was recorded at 970 mbar (hPa; 28.64 inHg). Hours later, however, it began to weaken, a trend that continued due to southwesterly wind shear and dry air. The cloud pattern associated with the hurricane deteriorated on October 2, and the center of circulation was separated from the convective activity. Otis weakened to a tropical storm and drifted erratically toward the north-northwest as a result of weak steering currents. Over increasingly cold waters, the cyclone further weakened to a depression on October 3 and consisted of a small swirl of low-level clouds. It became a remnant low pressure area the next day. The system abruptly turned southeastward and drifted parallel to the coast of the Baja California Peninsula until dissipating on October 5.

Preparations and impact
On September 30, the first tropical cyclone watches and warnings were issued with the declaration of tropical storm warnings and hurricane watches along portions of the east and west coasts of the Baja California Peninsula. For several days the advisories were adjusted and amended, and on October 1, a hurricane warning was posted for the west coast of Baja California, from Agua Blanca to San Andresito. By October 2, all watches and warnings were discontinued on the east coast of the peninsula, and the remaining advisories were lifted the next day. High winds and heavy rainfall were anticipated.

In advance of the storm, the governor of Baja California Sur, Narciso Agúndez Montaño, ordered emergency personnel to Comondú, Lorteo, and Mulege. Approximately 700 families fled to shelters in Cabo San Lucas; elsewhere, an additional 200 families evacuated in San Jose del Cabo. Some residents in Miraflores and Santiago also left their homes. Agundez asked soldiers to assist the isla Magdalena and Margarita in preparing for the storm. Five communities in Mexico, including Cabo San Lucas, declared a state of emergency. Authorities throughout the region opened numerous shelters, and in some locations, police officers went door-to-door asking residents to leave. The port in Cabo San Lucas was closed due to the storm's threat, although the airport remained open.

Although the center of Otis remained offshore, tropical storm-force winds were reported at higher elevations over portions of southern Baja California. There, periods of heavy rainfall mixed with fair skies as the storm passed. No damages or fatalities were reported, although some media reports indicated that the storm caused flooding in parts of the southern Baja California peninsula. Offshore, two ships reported tropical-storm-force winds in association with the storm: the Volendam on October 3, and the Star Harmonia on October 1.

See also

Other storms named Otis
Timeline of the 2005 Pacific hurricane season
List of Baja California Peninsula hurricanes
2005 Pacific hurricane season

References

Pacific hurricanes in Mexico
2005 Pacific hurricane season
Category 2 Pacific hurricanes
Otis